The Hierapolis sawmill was a Roman water-powered stone sawmill at Hierapolis, Asia Minor (modern-day Turkey). Dating to the second half of the 3rd century AD, the sawmill is considered the earliest known machine to combine a crank with a connecting rod to form a crank slider mechanism.

The watermill is evidenced by a raised relief on the sarcophagus of a certain Marcus Aurelius Ammianos, a local miller. On the pediment a waterwheel fed by a mill race is shown powering via a gear train two frame saws cutting rectangular blocks by the way of connecting rods and, through mechanical necessity, cranks (see diagram). The accompanying inscription is in Greek and attributes the mechanism to Ammianos' "skills with wheels".

Other sawmills 
Further Roman crank and connecting rod mechanisms, without gear train, are archaeologically attested for the 6th century AD water-powered stone sawmills at Gerasa, Jordan, and Ephesus, Turkey. A fourth sawmill possibly existed at Augusta Raurica, Switzerland, where a metal crankshaft from the 2nd century AD has been excavated.

Literary references to water-powered marble saws in Trier, Germany, can be found in Ausonius' late 4th century AD poem Mosella. About the same time, they also seem to be indicated by the Christian saint Gregory of Nyssa from Anatolia, demonstrating a diversified use of water-power in many parts of the Roman Empire.

The three finds push back the date of the invention of the crank and connecting rod mechanism by a full millennium; for the first time, all essential components of the much later steam engine were assembled by one technological culture:

See also 
 List of Roman watermills
 Barbegal aqueduct and mill

References

Sources 
 Roman sawmill at Hierapolis

 Roman sawmill at Gerasa

 Roman sawmill at Ephesos

 Possible Roman sawmill at Augusta Raurica

Further reading

External links 
Traianus – The European Portal of Roman Engineering to download "La máquina de serrar piedras", Klaus Grewe's article translated into Spanish, one needs to register at the site for free
Reconstruction of the water-powered sawmill at Ephesos (pictures, videoclips, 3D simulation) 

Ancient Roman watermills
Watermills in Turkey
Ancient inventions